Joncherey is a commune in the Territoire de Belfort department in Bourgogne-Franche-Comté in northeastern France.

History

Start of World War I 
The first fatalities on the Western Front of World War I occurred in this village on 2 August 1914 at 9:59 am, one day before the formal declaration of war between Germany and France. French corporal Jules André Peugeot was stationed in the village of Joncherey, southeast of Belfort, when he challenged a German army patrol, which had crossed the border few hours earlier. Peugeot commanded the Germans to stop and declared them under arrest. In response, the German officer commanding the patrol, Albert Mayer, pulled out his revolver and fired, hitting Peugeot in the shoulder.  Despite his wound, Peugeot fired with his pistol at Mayer but missed.  Peugeot's comrades then fired repeatedly at Mayer, shooting him first in the stomach and then in the head,  killing him.  Peugeot, severely wounded, returned to his billet, where he died from his injuries at 10:37 am.

Geography

Climate
Joncherey has a oceanic climate (Köppen climate classification Cfb).

See also
Communes of the Territoire de Belfort department

References

External links

Official website 

Communes of the Territoire de Belfort